Apple cheese is a traditional Lithuanian dessert, made out of boiled or cooked apples sweetened with sugar. Originally it was made with honey, which was later replaced by sugar.

History 
Originated during the Middle ages. The oldest dated recipe was written by the cook in the house of Radvila.

In 1907, the recipe for apple cheese was published in the Lithuanian magazine "" from Lithuania's capital Vilnius.

References 

Lithuanian desserts
Cheese
Cheese analogues